Erzsi Pártos (born Erzsébet Pollák; 2 April 1907 – 18 April 2000) was a Hungarian actress. She appeared in more than eighty films from 1932 to 1993.

Selected filmography

References

External links 

1907 births
2000 deaths
Hungarian film actresses